Hasu Kandi (also Romanized as Ḩasū Kandī) is a village in Baranduz Rural District, in the Central District of Urmia County, West Azerbaijan Province, Iran. At the 2006 census, its population was 206, in 43 families.

References 

Populated places in Urmia County